The All-Ireland Kick Fada Championship is an annual tournament testing the skills of Ireland's best Gaelic footballers. Fada is Irish for "long". Until 2012 the Kick Fada was sponsored by MBNA while the DAA will sponsor the event in 2013.
The tournament (first played in 2000) is held annually at Bray Emmets GAA club, County Wicklow. In 2012, 19 men and 22 women competed in the competition. The competition starts at the 35 meter mark, with each contestant allowed 3 attempts to kick the ball over the bar. Each contestant can kick from their hands, off the ground or drop-kick the ball. If a contestant fails to kick the ball over the bar in the 3 attempts they are eliminated from the competition. Rounds proceed with the successful contestant from the previous round kicking with the distance increased by a further 5 meters. Whoever can score a point from the furthest distance is the winner. There are separate competitions for men and women.

The Kick Fada record, which stands at 72 metres, was achieved by four time champion Mark Herbert from Kildare. Suzanne Hughes from Ballyboden St Endas GAA Club holds the all time female record of 52m from back in 2001.

As part of the Kick Fada, famous GAA stars and legends of the past are inducted into the "Hall of Fame"

Roll of honour

Men

Women

Hall of Fame

Masters

Rules

 The competition is open to all current GAA members over the age of 18.
 The object of the event is to find the longest yet most accurate kickers of a standard GAA football.
 The winner of the competition will be the contestant with the longest successful kick.
 A successful kick is deemed to be one where the ball crosses over the bar and between the posts prior to touching the ground.
 The ball used will be standard Size 5 for men and Size 4 for ladies.
 Each kick will be taken from a pre-determined marked distance from the target.
 The kick may be taken from the hand or from the ground.
 Players may use a tee if they so wish.
 The taking of a kick by each remaining contestant as a specific distance will be called a 'round'.
 There will be a maximum of three rounds per distance.
 Once a contestant has achieved a successful kick they will be deemed to have qualified for the next round and will not be required to take a further kick at the current distance.
 Each contestant will take a kick in turn until all remaining members of the group have completed an attempt at the current distance.
 After a maximum of three rounds at a particular distance the distance will be increased by a pre-determined number of metres and a new round will begin for all successful kickers.
 If a contestant fails to make any successful kick at a particular distance they will not go forward to the next round.
 In the event of no contestant achieving a successful kick in a round, there will be a sudden-death playoff of all contestants who qualified for that round.
 The winners of the competition will have the choice of continuing within the rules, to establish the longest successful kick and attempt to set a new record.
 The decision of the Kica Fada Event Co-ordinator will be final in the event of a dispute.

References

External links
Bray Emmets club page on the Kick Fada

Kick Fada Championship